Dragan Kojadinović (born 29 November 1954) is a Serbian journalist and former Minister of Culture.

Early life and education
He graduated from the Department of Yugoslav Literature and Serbian Language at the University of Belgrade Faculty of Philology.

Career
For almost thirty years he has worked as a journalist, and was the first director of the Studio B independent television. in 1990. He is one of the founders of the Independent Serbian Journalist Association (NUNS), and is a director of the Metropolis television company and the President of the Serbian Renewal Movement Committee in Belgrade. 

In 2004 he unsuccessfully campaigned to become the mayor of Belgrade.

Personal life
He speaks English. He is married with two children.

References

1954 births
Living people
University of Belgrade Faculty of Philology alumni
Serbian Renewal Movement politicians
Government ministers of Serbia